The barred surfperch (Amphistichus argenteus) is a species of surfperch native to inshore waters from northern California, United States to southern Baja California, Mexico. This species can reach a length of  TL though most do not exceed  TL. Like other surfperches, it gives birth to live young. The diet of the barred surfperch consists predominantly of sand crabs .

According to the California Department of Fish and Game, Barred Surfperch can be identified by bars and spots on sides which are often unbarred, as well as the absence of red tail.

Fishery 
Barred surfperch are an important sport fishery for most surf fishermen in California, as they are common in the surf zone.  Anglers use sand crabs, sandworms, blood worms, shrimp, squid, cut fish, and small hard baits to catch these fish.

References

External links
 Photograph

barred surfperch
Fish of Mexican Pacific coast
barred surfperch
Taxa named by Louis Agassiz